New Age communities are places where, intentionally or accidentally, communities have grown up to include significant numbers of people with New Age beliefs. An Intentional community may have specific aims but are varied and have a variety of structures, purposes and means of subsistence. These include authoritarian, democratic and consensual systems of internal government. New Age communities also exist on the Internet.

Notable communities

Australia

 Byron Bay
 Nimbin – a small town in north-east New South Wales that since the 1973 Aquarius Festival has been a center of hippie and alternative lifestyle.

Asia

 Ubud – south East Asia's centre for yoga and alternative lifestyle
 Pai  Northern Thailand

Europe

 Ceredigion, Wales
 Christiania, Copenhagen, Denmark
The group holds a mix of New Age and neopagan beliefs.
 Dornach, Switzerland
 Findhorn – a community founded in  1962 to act as a focal point for the work of Eileen and Peter Caddy and Dorothy Maclean near Findhorn, in Moray, Scotland
 Glastonbury – is particularly notable for the myths and legends surrounding a nearby hill, Glastonbury Tor, which rises up from the otherwise flat landscape of the Somerset Levels. These myths concern Joseph of Arimathea and the Holy Grail, and also King Arthur. Glastonbury is also said to be the centre of several ley lines.
 Monte Verità in Ascona, Switzerland.
 Stroud – a market town in the centre of Gloucestershire, England  ''A small Cotswold market town which has become known as 'Hippy Central.' '' 
 Totnes – known as "Britain's alternative capital. A New Age nirvana of Sufis, surfers and Buddhist builders ..."

United States

 Arcosanti, Arizona – a self-contained experimental town that began construction in 1970. Its architect, Paolo Soleri, designed the town to demonstrate ways urban conditions could be improved while minimizing the destructive impact on the Earth.
 Asheville, North Carolina
 Avalon Organic Gardens & EcoVillage, Arizona
 Bisbee, Arizona
 Bloomington, Indiana
 Boulder, Colorado – home of Chögyam Trungpa's Shambhala Center, Naropa University, and center of the Ken Wilber-based integral movement
 Breitenbush Hot Springs, Oregon
 Burlington, Vermont
 Cassadaga, Florida
 Chattanooga, Tennessee
 Crestone, Colorado
 Esalen, California – a center in Big Sur for humanistic alternative education and a nonprofit organization devoted to multidisciplinary studies ordinarily neglected or unfavoured by traditional academia.
 Eugene, Oregon
 Eureka, California
 Eureka Springs, Arkansas
 Fairfield, Iowa – home of Maharishi University of Management (formerly Maharishi International University) since 1974 and has been referred to as "the world's largest training center" for practitioners of the Transcendental Meditation technique.
 Harbin Hot Springs, California
 Hot Springs, Arkansas – an ancient Native American gathering place featuring over 47 natural hot springs. Now houses a large community of Native American and New Age healing art practitioners. 
 Idyllwild, California
 Ithaca, New York
 Joshua Tree, California
 Lily Dale, New York
 Marfa, Texas
 Missoula, Montana
 Moab, Utah
 Mount Shasta, California
 Ojai, California
 Paia, Hawaii 
 Portland, Oregon
 Roseburg, Oregon
 Santa Fe, New Mexico
 Salem, Massachusetts
 Sedona, Arizona – is where the "Harmonic Convergence" was organized by Jose Arguelles in 1987. Purported "spiritual vortices" are said to be concentrated in the region.
 Summertown, Tennessee
 Taos, New Mexico
 Topanga, California
 Venice, California
 Yellow Springs, Ohio

Central America

 San Marcos La Laguna, Guatemala – A very small town on Lake Atitlan. There is an assortment of schools, teachers, and healers. Las Piramides del Ka was the first school to bring yoga and meditation to San Marcos La Laguna. Now there are a variety of different schools teaching yoga, Tai Chi, Massage, Reiki, breathwork, etc.

India

 Auroville, Tamil Nadu
 Goa

Charismatic leadership

Such communities may be founded by charismatic leaders who may be credited with quasi-religious status, being considered gurus or messiahs. Such leaders inhibit the survival of these communities.

See also

 Environmentalism
 Global Ecovillage Network
 List of intentional communities
 Omega Institute for Holistic Studies

References

External links
 Intentional Communities website